Proportionality for Solid Coalitions (PSC) is a voting system criterion relating to ranked voting systems. It's the essential requirement to guarantee a proportional representation of voters  in multiple winner ranked voting systems.

Solid coalitions
Informally speaking, a solid coalition is a group of voters who prefer any candidate within a certain set of candidates over any candidate not in the set.

 When a voter is part of a solid coalition that prefers some set of candidates, they are said to be "solidly supporting" or "solidly committed to" that set of candidates. Any voter who ranks a single candidate as their 1st choice solidly supports that candidate.

Note that a solid coalition may be "nested" within another solid coalition; for example, there may be a faction of voters that can further be split into subfactions.

In the following let  be the number of voters,  be the number of seats to be filled and  be some positive integer.

–PSC
–PSC is defined with respect to the Hare quota . This criterion was proposed by Michael Dummett.

In the single-winner case, k-PSC is equivalent to the unanimity criterion, as a Hare quota there would comprise all voters.

–PSC
–PSC is defined like –PSC, but with respect to the Hagenbach-Bischoff quota  instead of the Hare quota: the number of voters in  must exceed  Hagenbach-Bischoff quotas. (The reason it is "exceed" rather than "at least" here is because there can be more HB quotas than seats.)

It is a generalization of the majority criterion in the sense that it relates to groups of supported candidates (solid coalitions) instead of just one candidate, and there may be more than one seat to be filled. Because some authors call the fraction  Droop quota, –PSC is also known as Droop proportionality criterion.

 One major implication of Droop proportionality is that a majority solid coalition will always be able to elect at least half of the seats. This is because a majority is always over n/2 voters, which is equivalent to a number of voters exceeding half of the Hagenbach-Bischoff quotas (There are (k+1) Hagenbach-Bischoff quotas in an election, since (n/(k+1)) * (k+1) = n, so (k+1)/2, which is half of the quotas * n/(k+1), which is the quota, = n/2).

Generalizations
The Expanding Approvals Rule, a proportional form of Bucklin voting, satisfies a stronger version of PSC which allows some voters in the solid coalition to prefer candidates not solidly supported by all other voters in the solid coalition.

See also
 Mutual majority criterion

References

Political science terminology